Phacaspis is a genus of flies in the family Dolichopodidae. It is known from Southeast Asia and Papua New Guinea. Flies in the genus are small (less than 2 mm long), with metallic green coloring. They are marine, and are commonly found on mudflats in front of mangroves.

The generic name is derived from the Ancient Greek phaktós ("lens") and aspís ("round shield" or clypeus), referring to the swollen lens-shaped clypeus.

The genus was originally regarded as incertae sedis within the family Dolichopodidae. In the World Catalog of Dolichopodidae (Insecta: Diptera) by Yang et al. (2006), the new subfamily Kowmunginae was proposed to include both Kowmungia and Phacaspis. This placement was later criticized by Sinclair et al. (2008), who suggested that the genus would have been better placed as incertae sedis until a later phylogenetic study determines its placement.

Species
The genus contains three species:
Phacaspis mitis Grootaert & Meuffels, 2001
Phacaspis ornata Meuffels & Grootaert, 1988
Phacaspis petiolata Meuffels & Grootaert, 1988

References

Further reading
 

Dolichopodidae
Dolichopodidae genera
Diptera of Asia
Insects of New Guinea